Paul Lendvai (born in Lendvai Pál; August 24, 1929) is a Hungarian-born Austrian journalist. He moved to Austria in 1957, and is working as an author and journalist.

Biography 
Lendvai was born on 24 August 1929 in Budapest to Jewish parents. In the late 1940s to the early 1950s (also known as the Rákosi era) Lendvai worked as a journalist in Hungary starting from 1947. Lendvai wrote for Szabad Nép and was also chief of foreign reporting in the Hungarian news agency (MTI). Lendvai's books in the 1950s include "Tito the enemy of the Hungarian people" (1951) and "France at a crossroads" (1955), with 50,000 copies. As a former Social Democrat, he was judged as politically unreliable and was jailed for eight months during 1953 and banned from the media for three years.

Lendvai was a member of the Communist Party, but he didn't participate in the suppression of the Revolution of 1956. He left Hungary on assignment to report from Poland and in 1957 he went to Vienna, Austria.

After arriving in Vienna, Lendvai soon started looking for work, at first limited by lack of sufficient language skills. In this period he helped foreign correspondents with matters relating to Hungary and wrote smaller articles under aliases such as "György Holló", "Árpád Bécs" or "Paul Landy". Lendvai soon overcame early difficulties and was naturalized in Austria in 1959, and became a journalist and commentator on Eastern Europe. He was the correspondent for Eastern Europe of the daily Die Presse and the Financial Times for twenty-two years. He also contributed to The Economist and wrote columns for Austrian, German and Swiss newspapers and radio stations. In 1982 Lendvai became editor-in-chief at the Eastern Europe department of the ORF public broadcasting company and director-general of Radio Österreich International in 1987. His weekly columns were published by the newspaper Der Standard. In 1985, a Cultural Forum dubbed the east–west summit was organized by the Hungarian communist leadership, to which 900 politicians, writers and other notable people were invited. At the same time a "counter cultural forum" was planned with expected participation of "dissidents and opposition groups". György Konrád was one of the intended speakers. In 2010, a Hungarian pro-government newspaper accused Paul Lendvai of collaboration with the communist regime by having provided information about the counter-forum to the Hungarian authorities. Socialist ex-prime minister Ferenc Gyurcsány came to Paul Lendvai's defence, saying "As for me, I support him in his struggle to make a case for his decisions of yesteryear. ... And we've got to stop digging up the past." György Konrád, one of the intended speakers of the opposition event, said: "If this was how things were, then it is very sad" about Lendvai providing the information. Lendvai rejected the accusations and said that the campaign against him was due to his criticism of the present government in his latest book. Former conservative MP Debreczeni, noted philosopher Sandor Radnoti, Austrian conservative leader Erhard Busek defended his integrity. János Nagy, the ambassador whom Lendvai talked to at the time, was interviewed about the matter on Klubrádió and insisted that his reports always faithfully rendered what was said. An article printed in left-wing Népszabadság agrees with Lendvai's defense that he was not an agent, although it goes on to stress that he was nonetheless a willing and active collaborator to the Communist regime.

On 19 March 2011 Lendvai presented the Hungarian translation of his latest book Mein verspieltes Land ("My squandered country") in Budapest. In his memoir, Lendvai portrays a picture of ethnic hatred, political turbulence and antisemitism in 20th century Central Europe.

Lendvai is editor in chief and co-publisher of Europäische Rundschau, a Vienna-based international quarterly. Austrian president Heinz Fischer and former Czech foreign minister Karel Schwarzenberg held speeches at the 40th anniversary of the review on 8 November 2013. Lendvai was appointed chairman of the independent migration council for Austria on 3 April 2014 by the minister of the interior.

Secret police file 

In the 1990s Lendvai tried to obtain the secret service file on himself in a face-to-face meeting with Socialist Prime Minister Gyula Horn but wasn't successful at that time. While being honoured in the Hungarian Parliament Lendvai said "I'd rather get my files than the award". Originally the file was classified until 15 February 2042 but with many other documents they were declassified based on a 2003 law. In 2006 Lendvai requested and received the documents from the archives of the Hungarian secret services and described some of their contents to the public in an article carried by literary weekly Élet és Irodalom (ÉS), including naming several spies working on his case. Lendvai writes that the files on him are over 300 pages long and refer to Lendvai under the codename Michael Cole. Lendvai presents his article on the topic with the subtitle "the story of an unsuccessful recruitment" saying the Hungarian services wanted to enlist him as an agent but failed. While according to the file, Lendvai was never recruited as a spy, in a 24 July 1963 report, the archived documents refer to Lendvai as "one of the best contacts" of the intelligence services at the time. Lendvai in his article describes several aims he wanted to achieve by contacting the Hungarian authorities, the ability to travel to Hungary for reporting, travel visa for his mother, and revocation of his Hungarian citizenship enabling him to work in eastern bloc communist countries. He managed to obtain some of these goals he says by bringing Hungarian officials such as Gyula Ortutay to Austrian striptease shows. According to Lendvai both times he brought Ortutay to such a show he would intervene on his behalf. In one case Lendvai writes that the reports of "Urbán", identifying Lendvai as a source of information on various topics were falsified, containing material invented by Urbán himself.

Works
 Tito, a magyar nép ellensége (1951)
 Franciaország keresztúton (1955)
 Eagles in cobwebs: nationalism and communism in the Balkans (1969)
 Anti-Semitism without Jews: Communist Eastern Europe (1971)
 Anti-Semitism in Eastern Europe (1972)
 Kreisky – Portrait eines Staatsmannes (1974)
 Die Grenzen des Wandels: Spielarten des Kommunismus im Donauraum (1977)
 Bureaucracy of Truth: How Communist Governments Manage the News (1981)
 Das Einsame Albanien: Reportage aus dem Land der Skipetaren (1985)
 Das eigenwillige Ungarn: Innenansichten eines Grenzgangers (1986)
 Hungary: The Art of Survival (1990)
 Honnan – Hová? – Gondolatok a közép- és kelet-európai változásokról (1995)
 Auf schwarzen Listen. Erlebnisse eines Mitteleuropäers (1996)
 Blacklisted: A Journalist's Life in Central Europe (1998)
 Hungarians: A Thousand Years of Victory in Defeat (2003)
 A világ egy kritikus európai szemével (2005)
 Az osztrák titok – 50 év a hatalom kulisszái mögött (2007)
 Best of Paul Lendvai (2008)
 One Day That Shook the Communist World: The 1956 Hungarian Uprising and Its Legacy (2008)
 Inside Austria: New Challenges, Old Demons (2010)
 Mein verspieltes Land – Ungarn im Umbruch (2010)
 Az eltékozolt ország (2011)
 Három élet – Beszélgetés Mihancsik Zsófiával (2012)
 Hungary: Between Democracy and Authoritarianism (2012)
 Leben eines Grenzgängers (2013)
 Orbáns Ungarn (2016)
 Orbán: Europe's New Strongman (2017)

Decorations and awards
 1974: Dr.-Karl-Renner-journalism award
 1974: Golden Decoration of Honour for Services to the Republic of Austria
 1980: Appointed Professor
 1984: Karl Renner Prize of Vienna
 1986: Grand Decoration of Honour for Services to the Republic of Austria
 1989: Gold Medal for services to the city of Vienna
 1990: Great Gold Medal of Styria
 1990: Grand Cross of Merit of the Federal Republic of Germany
 1994: Austrian Cross of Honour for Science and Art, 1st class
 1994: Bruno Kreisky Prize for Political Books for Between hope and disillusionment – reflections on the changes in Eastern Europe
 1997: Silver Commander's Cross of Honour for Services to the province of Lower Austria
 1998: Axel Corti Prize
 1999: Commander's Cross of the Order of Merit of the Republic of Poland
 2000: Grand Prize of Burgenland Journalist Award
 2001: Television Award of the Austrian Adult Education for his biography of Bruno Kreisky (with Helene Maimann)
 2001: Award of the Budapest Corvinus Europe Institute
 2001: Grand Gold Decoration for Services to the Republic of Austria
 2002: Dr. Alois Mock Europe Prize
 2003: Commander's Cross with Star of the Order of Merit of the Republic of Hungary
 2003: Fellowship of the Centre for Applied Policy Research (Ludwig Maximilian University of Munich)
 2005: Austrian State Prize for Cultural Journalism
 2008: Honorary Award of the Austrian book trade for tolerance in thought and action

References

External links 
 Lelepleztük a német sajtó Magyarország felelősét
 The unreluctant henchman
 Paul Lendvai reloaded
 State Prize for Cultural Journalism 2006 goes to Paul Lendvai

1929 births
Writers from Budapest
Hungarian journalists
Austrian Jews
Austrian journalists
Hungarian people of Jewish descent
Hungarian emigrants to Austria
Living people
Austrian television presenters
Commanders Crosses of the Order of Merit of the Federal Republic of Germany
Recipients of the Austrian Cross of Honour for Science and Art, 1st class
Commanders of the Order of Merit of the Republic of Poland
Recipients of the Grand Decoration for Services to the Republic of Austria
Commander's Crosses with Star of the Order of Merit of the Republic of Hungary (civil)
Recipients of the Austrian State Prize